Üzümveren is a village in the Güroymak District of Bitlis Province in Turkey. Its population is 103 (2021).

References

Villages in Güroymak District